is a Japanese former freestyle swimmer who competed in the 1988 Summer Olympics.

References

1971 births
Living people
Japanese female freestyle swimmers
Olympic swimmers of Japan
Swimmers at the 1988 Summer Olympics
Asian Games medalists in swimming
Swimmers at the 1990 Asian Games
Asian Games bronze medalists for Japan
Medalists at the 1990 Asian Games
20th-century Japanese women
21st-century Japanese women